Ain Aata, Ain Ata, 'Ain 'Ata or Ayn Aata is a village and municipality situated southwest of Rashaya,  south-east of Beirut, in the Rashaya District of the Beqaa Governorate in Lebanon.

The name is thought to mean "gift spring". There is a remarkably cold spring in the area.

History
In 1838, Eli Smith noted  'Ain 'Ata's population as being Druze and "Greek" Christians.

Roman temple
Recent epigraphic surveys have confirmed the ruins of a Roman temple and cult site in the village that are included in the group of Temples of Mount Hermon.

See also
 Druze in Lebanon
 Lebanese Greek Orthodox Christians

References

Bibliography

External links
Ain Aata on Localiban
'Ain 'Ata on geographic.org
Photos of Roman temples in the Rashaya area on the American University of Beirut website
Roman Temples on discoverlebanon.com
Ain Ata on wikimapia
Ain Ata on geody.com
Hebrew concordance entry for Beth-Anath, "Temple of Anat"

Populated places in Rashaya District
Archaeological sites in Lebanon
Ancient Roman temples
Roman sites in Lebanon
Tourist attractions in Lebanon
Druze communities in Lebanon
Eastern Orthodox Christian communities in Lebanon